Antoine Jacson ( – 6 December 1803) was a Canadian soldier and wood carver. Jacson worked as a master wood carver in Quebec, contributing friezes, rosettes and other decorative elements to churches throughout the province, including the Notre-Dame Basilica in Quebec City.

References 

1720s births
1803 deaths
Canadian woodcarvers